Su-Kam Power Systems Ltd. is an Indian power provider which sells its products in more than 90 countries. The company provides power back-up for both domestic as well as industrial markets, and focuses on eco-friendly energy like solar power. Some of the major products include solar charge controller, solar power conditioning units, solar grid-tie inverters, solar off-grid power systems, home inverters, home UPS, Online UPS, line interactive UPS, batteries, battery chargers and battery equalizers.

It sells through its network of 1,200 distributors and 25,000 dealers.
Su-Kam Power Systems is an Indian solar power company.

History
Su-Kam started in 1988 as a start up and today, the company has reached a junction where It can  say that it has succeeded in building a brand to reckon with. With presence in more than 90 countries it hold the record of highest export sales by any Indian Company In power backup industry. Su-Kam was the first Indian company to introduce DSP sinewave inverters and plastic-body inverters in India. Su-Kam is also said to have filed largest number of patents in the power back-up industry - an average of two patents every month.

Su-Kam was the first company in the world to launch plastic body inverters. India Today included Su-Kam's plastic body inverters in the list of top 10 innovations of the decade in 2010. The design uses advanced plastics which can withstand high temperatures.

Su-Kam launched India's first touchscreen Solar PCU which had a MPPT solar charge controller and could be monitored through smartphones through its in-built wifi.

Su-Kam introduced solar street lights with an in-built lithium ion battery which was more efficient than traditional lead acid based solar street lights.

Corporate management and revenues
The current directors of Su-kam Power Systems Ltd are Mr.Vishnu Prakash Goyal, Mr.Ashok Kumar Gupta, Mr.Navraj Mittal and Mr. Yajan Bansal and the other board members are Mr Rajnish Bansal, Mr Sanchit Sekwal and Mr Anish Gupta. 

Su-Kam had also planned to enter into consumer financing to target lower income groups. It was going to set up a Non-Banking Finance Company (NBFC).

Innovations and patents
Su-Kam has filed over 76 Technology Patents, 189 Copyrights, 136 Trademarks and has 88 Design Patents to its credit in India, USA and other countries. Today, nearly 2 technology patents are filed in a month and the company expects to have an impressive 100 technology patents.

Su-Kam's focus on solar products
Su-Kam is now shifting its focus from conventional UPS, inverters, and batteries to solar products. As per a report published by Bridge to India in 2014, Su-kam with 20.6% market share and pan India presence is the biggest player in the residential solar market. Su-kam is also the biggest domestic inverter supplier with 32% market share in the off-grid and hybrid inverters segments, according to the report.

Su-Kam provides customised solar power for educational institutions, petrol pumps, hospitals, industries, defence barracks, and government buildings. It has undertaken solar projects for  Tamil Nadu Energy Development Agency, Assam State Electricity board, Madhya Pradesh Forest Department, Loyola College of Chennai, Ashok Leyland, and Assam Rifles.

"Solar power system contributes around 25 per cent to the total business of Su-Kam, and its target is to grow it to 50 per cent of the total turnover", said  Su-Kam in an interview to Business Standard.

Solar installations done by Su-Kam

Su-Kam Power Systems has installed solar power systems across 10,000 houses in seven districts under the Tamil Nadu Chief Minister's Solar Powered Green House Scheme.

The company has installed 1MW Solar Power Plant at Punjab Engineering College in Chandigarh.

In May 2014 Su-Kam won a tender from Uttar Pradesh New and Renewable Energy Development Agency to install and commission solar power systems in 40,000 rural households in Uttar Pradesh.

It also installed 250 kwp mini off-grid solar system to electrify Fakirpur and Chandigarh villages in Kannauj. These villages have never been electrified before. The inauguration of solar plant was done by Dr. APJ Abdul Kalam and Chief Minister of Uttar Pradesh Akhilesh Yadav.

Su-Kam installed 50 kW solar grid-tie system at Delhi Jal Board's office in Delhi.

Su-Kam installed 40 kWp solar power system at Allied Engineering Works which is said to generate 56,000 units of electricity.

Foreign operations and exports
Su-Kam's exports are growing. Su-Kam's total exports contribute around 12-15% of the revenue of its entire business, and most of it comes from Africa. Su-Kam has also been awarded with the title 'Africa's Most Reliable Inverter Brand'.

Su-Kam has won a solar project to power 35 schools in Rwanda. It has also set up a product experience in Uganda. According to media statements, Su-Kam has solar projects in Nigeria, Gabon, Afghanistan and Malawi.

Su-Kam has installed 2,000 solar street lights in Kango, Mouila and Bitam villages of Gabon. The company has also installed hybrid power systems that make use of wind and solar energy in five remote villages in Malawi - Chigundu, Mdayaka, Eluyumi, Kumbande and Kadzuwa.

CSR initiatives
Su-Kam has adopted village Baniyani in Rohtak district of Haryana which is the native village of Manohar Lal Khattar, the current Chief Minister of Haryana. The company is going to develop it under public-private partnership model. The MD of Su-Kam said in an interview to a newspaper that Su-Kam would provide facilities  at the government school and streetlights in the village.

After the earthquake in Nepal in April 2015, Su-Kam distributed food and 800 solar home lighting systems to the victims.

Coverage in books and TV media

Discovery Channel India aired a documentary called 'Sun Fuel India' which shows how Su-Kam's solar installations are helping Indian villages and cities go solar.

References

Electronics companies of India
Energy companies of India
Solar energy companies of India
Manufacturing companies based in Gurgaon
Electronics companies established in 1988
Energy companies established in 1998
Renewable resource companies established in 1988
Indian brands
Indian companies established in 1988
1998 establishments in Haryana